Gale Peak is a 10,690-foot-elevation (3,258 meter) mountain summit located in Madera County, California, United States. It is situated in the Sierra Nevada mountain range, in the southeast corner of Yosemite National Park, on the common boundary which the park shares with the Ansel Adams Wilderness. Precipitation runoff from this landform drains west into tributaries of the South Fork Merced River, and east into tributaries of the San Joaquin River.

History
This geographical feature was named in 1894 by Lieutenant Nathaniel Fish McClure who prepared a map of Yosemite National Park for use by Army troops. The toponym honors Captain George Henry Goodwin Gale (1858–1920), 4th Cavalry US Army, and the acting military superintendent of Yosemite Park in 1894. The US Army had jurisdiction over Yosemite National Park from 1891 to 1914, and each summer 150 cavalrymen traveled from the Presidio of San Francisco to patrol the park. This geographical feature's toponym was officially adopted in 1932 by the U.S. Board on Geographic Names.

The first ascent of the summit was made in 1920 by Lawrence Fley, Freeman Jones, and Thomas Jones.

Climate
According to the Köppen climate classification system, Gale Peak is located in an alpine climate zone. Most weather fronts originate in the Pacific Ocean and travel east toward the Sierra Nevada mountains. As fronts approach, they are forced upward by the peaks (orographic lift), causing them to drop their moisture in the form of rain or snowfall onto the range.

Gallery

See also
 
 Geology of the Yosemite area

References

External links
 Weather forecast: Gale Peak
 George Henry Goodwin Gale: Findagrave.com
 George H. G. Gale: Military history
 Gale Peak (photo): Flickr

Mountains of Yosemite National Park
Sierra National Forest
Mountains of Madera County, California
Mountains of the Ansel Adams Wilderness
North American 3000 m summits
Mountains of Northern California
Sierra Nevada (United States)
Mountains of the Sierra Nevada (United States)